"5:15" (sometimes written "5.15" or "5'15") is a song written by Pete Townshend of British rock band The Who. Part of the band's second rock opera, Quadrophenia (1973), the song was also released as a single and reached No. 20 on the UK Singles Chart, while the 1979 re-release (accompanying the film and soundtrack album) reached No. 45 on the Billboard Hot 100.

Although written as "5.15" on the single covers in some countries, on the back cover of Quadrophenia (the album from which the song is taken) it is written as "5:15", and some single covers also have "5:15".

Background
The lyrics of "5:15" describe Quadrophenia'''s protagonist, Jimmy, travelling to Brighton on a train. The song's writer, Pete Townshend, said of the song's lyrics:

No demo recording of the song exists, as the track was written in the studio on the day the song was recorded. The whistle heard on the track was recorded after Townshend's driver bribed a British train driver with five pounds to sound the train's whistle as it pulled out, despite breaking the station rules.

"5:15" was released as a single in Britain and Europe shortly before the release of Quadrophenia in October 1973. Backed with  the Lifehouse outtake "Water", the single charted at #20 in Britain and #46 in Germany. The single was not released in America, where "Love, Reign o'er Me" and "The Real Me" were chosen as singles instead. Roger Daltrey later commented on the song's single release, "Really, it was the only single on Quadrophenia we could have released."
The 7-inch vinyl single mix differs from the wider soundscape of the album mix and appears as a narrower closed stereo; however, the overall dynamics are just as powerful. This particular mix is not available on CD. All compilations making claim to the single mix have used the album mix version and cut to a variety of different running time lengths plus or minus a few seconds.
"Water", the B-side, is a track recorded during the April–May 1970 sessions at I.B.C. and Eel Pie Studios, and was originally intended for an EP, available on Odds & Sods.

Lyrics
In the song, the main character Jimmy has taken the 5:15 train to Brighton, consumed a lot of drugs, recollecting his life with the Mods, the cultural movement to which he belongs (even if he has dropped out for now), and their duels with the Rockers. Jimmy's memories are extremely disjointed, consisting mainly of anger, confusion, violence, sexual frustration, and rootlessness.

"5:15", like many of the songs from Quadrophenia, is self-referential - "M-m-m-my generation" is a line - and thus represents an angrily self-centred, teenage disconnection with society, family and the opposite sex. 'Jimmy' was "born in the war" (that is, World War II and its aftermath) and does not understand why he should care about it (or anything) in the context of his extravagant Mod values.

Soundtrack version

In 1979, "5:15" and nine other tracks from Quadrophenia were remixed by John Entwistle for the soundtrack of the film adaptation of the original rock opera. This version of "5:15" was released as a single in September 1979 to promote the album, reaching #45 on the Billboard Hot 100 in America. Record World'' said of this version that "All the thunderous fury that so often dominates The Who's music is everpresent."

Live performances
Live performances of "5:15" sometimes included, in addition to the Who's four members, a full brass section and a piano. During the Who reunion tour from 1999 to 2002, bassist John Entwistle played a solo in mid-song, lasting several minutes, only accompanied by drummer Zak Starkey.
During The Who's 2012 Quadrophenia tour, long after Entwistle's death in 2002, his bass solo was featured by showing footage from a 2000 performance at the Royal Albert Hall while Starkey played live.

Personnel
The Who
 Roger Daltrey – lead vocals
 Pete Townshend – guitar, backing and lead vocals
 John Entwistle – bass guitar, french horn, backing vocals
 Keith Moon – drums

Featuring
 Chris Stainton – piano

See also
"On the 5:15"

References

The Who songs
1973 singles
Glam rock songs
Songs written by Pete Townshend
Songs about drugs
Songs about trains
Song recordings produced by Glyn Johns
Track Records singles
MCA Records singles
1973 songs
Song recordings produced by Pete Townshend